The following lists events that happened during 1928 in Australia.

Incumbents

Monarch – George V
Governor-General – John Baird, 1st Viscount Stonehaven
Prime Minister – Stanley Bruce
Chief Justice – Adrian Knox

State premiers
Premier of New South Wales – Thomas Bavin
Premier of Queensland – William McCormack
Premier of South Australia – Richard Layton Butler
Premier of Tasmania – Joseph Lyons (until 15 June), then John McPhee
Premier of Victoria – Edmond Hogan (until 22 November), then William McPherson
Premier of Western Australia – Philip Collier

State governors
Governor of New South Wales – Sir Dudley de Chair
Governor of Queensland – Sir John Goodwin
Governor of South Australia – Sir Alexander Hore-Ruthven (from 14 May)
Governor of Tasmania – Sir James O'Grady
Governor of Victoria – Arthur Somers-Cocks, 6th Baron Somers
Governor of Western Australia – Sir William Campion

Events
27–28 January – Bundaberg tragedy: 12 children die in Bundaberg, Queensland, after being inoculated with a diphtheria vaccine contaminated with the Staphylococcus aureus bacterium.
22 February – Bert Hinkler arrives in Darwin, Northern Territory after flying solo from London on 7 February, and then, later, he arrives in his hometown of Bundaberg, Queensland on 27 February.
 17 May – The Royal Flying Doctor Service of Australia makes its first official flight from Cloncurry to Julia Creek
8 June –  Charles Kingsford Smith and his crew arrive in Brisbane, Queensland, after completing the first flight across the Pacific Ocean in the "Southern Cross" after leaving the United States on 31 May.
 14 August – The Coniston massacre begins.
 20 December – Hubert Wilkins makes the first flight over Antarctica in his Lockheed Vega San Francisco
 The first Speedos are produced

Arts and literature

 John Longstaff wins the Archibald Prize with his portrait of Dr Alexander Leeper
 Arthur Streeton wins the Wynne Prize with his landscape Afternoon Light, Goulburn Valley

Film
 29 December – The Jazz Singer becomes the first sound film screened in Australia. It premieres at the Lyceum Theatre in Sydney

Sport
15 September - The 1928 NSWRFL season culminates in South Sydney's 26–5 victory over Eastern Suburbs in the final.
6 November – Statesman wins the Melbourne Cup.
 Victoria wins the Sheffield Shield
 Bobby Pearce wins Australia's only gold medal at the 1928 Summer Olympics. He won the men's 200m sculls
 The first Australian Grand Prix is held at Phillip Island

Births
 17 January – Ken Archer, cricketer
 19 January – John Treloar, track and field athlete (died 2012)
 21 January – James Achurch, javelin thrower (died 2015)
 14 March – June Maston, sprinter and athletics coach (died 2004)
 2 April – Denis Flannery, rugby league footballer of the 1940s and 1950s (died 2012)
 30 May – Pro Hart, artist (died 2006)
 June – Mike Williamson, sports commentator (died 2019)
 3 June – Beryl Kimber, violinist and educator (died 2022)
 12 June – Bob Davis, Australian rules footballer (died 2011)
 15 June – Joan Croll, physician and radiologist (died 2022)
 18 June – Michael Blakemore, actor and director 
 1 July – Robert Wemyss, Australian football (soccer) player
 7 July – Henry Sommerville, fencer (died 2010)
 17 July – David Leach, senior officer of the Royal Australian Navy (died 2020)
 18 July – Russell Mockridge, cyclist (died 1958)
 8 August – Don Burrows, jazz musician (died 2020)
 12 August – Charles Blackman, painter (died 2018)
 31 August – A. W. Pryor, physicist (died 2014)
 8 October – Leonard French, glass artist (died 2017)
 27 October – Thomas Perrin, cricketer
 16 November – Patricia Giles, activist (died 2017)
 17 November – Colin McDonald, cricketer (died 2021)
 18 November – Bruce Rosier, Anglican bishop (died 2019)
 30 November – Steele Hall, Premier of South Australia
 15 December – Peter Coleman, politician and writer (died 2019)
 26 December – Maureen Brunt, economist (died 2019)
 27 December – Phillip Bennett, Governor of Tasmania
date unknown – John Challis, gay rights activist

Deaths

 9 February – William Gillies, 21st Premier of Queensland (b. 1868)
 1 April – Andrew Lang Petrie, Queensland politician (b. 1854)
 19 May – John Barrett, Victorian politician (b. 1858)
 19 July – Norman Ewing, Tasmanian Opposition Leader (b. 1870)
 22 October – Andrew Fisher, 5th Prime Minister of Australia (born and died in the United Kingdom) (b. 1862)
 Unknown, possibly August – Bert Rache, composer (b. unknown)

See also
 List of Australian films of the 1920s

References

 
Australia
Years of the 20th century in Australia